Senator Colquitt may refer to:

Alfred H. Colquitt (1824–1894), U.S. Senator from Georgia from 1883 to 1894
Oscar Branch Colquitt (1861–1940), Texas State Senate
Walter T. Colquitt (1799–1855), U.S. Senator from Georgia from 1843 to 1848